The Barkleys is an American animated television series that aired in Autumn of 1972 on NBC and was produced by DePatie–Freleng Enterprises.

Premise
The cartoon – inspired by the CBS sitcom All in the Family – featured an anthropomorphic dog family consisting of Arnie, a bus driver (voiced by Henry Corden) and his wife Agnes (voiced by Joan Gerber). They had two teenagers, Terry and Roger (voiced by Julie McWhirter and Steve Lewis respectively) and one younger child, Chester (voiced by Gene Andrusco).

The theme song's lyrics ended with the advice "Just remember Arnie Barkley's bark is worse than his bite". Doug Goodwin's theme song used part of "(Be It Ever So Humble) There's No Place Like Home".

Airings
The series was broadcast by NBC from September 9 to December 2, 1972. NBC continued to air reruns until September 1, 1973. Only 13 episodes were produced.

The series resurfaced in 2016, airing Saturday mornings on the Retro TV network. It is currently streaming daily on the Classic Toons channel on Pluto TV.

Cast
 Henry Corden as Arnie Barkley
 Joan Gerber as Agnes Barkley
 Julie McWhirter as Terry Barkley
 Gene Andrusco as Chester Barkley
 Steve Lewis as Roger Barkley
 Michael Bell
 Bob Frank
 Bob Holt
 Don Messick
 Frank Welker

Episodes

Home media
In October 2015, Film Chest Media Group released The Barkleys and The Houndcats – 2 DVD Classic Animation Set on DVD in Region 1. This collection features all 13 episodes of the series on DVD.

Staff
 Created for Television by David H. DePatie, Isadore "Friz" Freleng
 In Association With Joe Ruby, Ken Spears
 Writers: Larry Rhine, Woody Kling, Dennis Marks, David Evans
 Animation Director: David Detiege
 Storyboard Directors: Gerry Chiniquy, Art Leonardi, Cullen Houghtaling, Paul Sommer
 Layout Supervision and Design by Robert Taylor
 Layouts: Cullen Houghtaling, Owen Fitzgerald, Richard Ung, Frank M. Gonzales, Nino Carbe, Wes Herschensohn
 Animation: Don Williams, Manny Gould, Ken Muse, Norm McCabe, Warren Batchelder, Jim Davis, John Gibbs, Bob Richardson, Bob Matz, Bob Bransford, Reuben Timmins, Bob Bemiller
 Background Supervised by Richard H. Thomas, Mary O'Loughlin
 Film Editing Supervised by Lee Gunther
 Film Editors: Joe Siracusa, Allan R. Potter, Roger Donley, Rick Steward
 Title Design by Art Leonardi
 Music by Doug Goodwin
 Music Score Conducted by Eric Rogers
 Music Recording Engineer: Eric A. Tomlinson
 Executive in Charge of Production: Stan Paperny
 Production Supervision: Harry Love
 Camera: Ray Lee, Larry Hogan, John Burton Jr.
 Production Mixer: Steve Orr
 Sound by Producers' Sound Service, Inc.
 Associate Producers: Joe Ruby, Ken Spears
 Produced by David H. DePatie, Friz Freleng

References

External links
 
 
 The Barkleys at Don Markstein's Toonopedia. Archived from the original on August 27, 2015.

1970s American animated television series
1972 American television series debuts
1973 American television series endings
American children's animated comedy television series
NBC original programming
Television series by DePatie–Freleng Enterprises
Television series by CBS Studios
English-language television shows
Animated television series about children
Animated television series about dogs
Animated television series about families
Television series created by Joe Ruby
Television series created by Ken Spears